The Church of St Peter in Old Market Street, Blackley, Manchester, England, is a Gothic Revival church of 1844 by E. H. Shellard. It was a Commissioners' church erected at a cost of £3162. The church is particularly notable for an almost completely intact interior. It was designated a Grade II* listed building on 20 June 1988.

The church is of "coursed sandstone rubble with ashlar dressings". The nave has buttresses and "clumsy" pinnacles and ends in a "blunt" west tower. The interior is aisled and "particularly impressive for its complete (nineteenth century) interior with the extremely unusual survival of all the fine boxes and other pews".

The churchyard contains the war graves of ten service personnel of World War I and seven of World War II.

See also

Grade II* listed buildings in Greater Manchester
Listed buildings in Manchester-M9

References

Bibliography

Grade II* listed churches in Manchester
Churches in Manchester
Church of England church buildings in Greater Manchester
Commissioners' church buildings
Churches completed in 1844
19th-century Church of England church buildings